The Kuril, Kureel are members of Chamar caste and mainly populated in the Central doab and Lower doab regions of the state.They are predominantly members of the Scheduled Castes in Uttar Pradesh.

History 
The history of Kureel clan is still unknown that how they came into existence but historically they were part of leather tanning community of Uttar Pradesh.

Kureels saw a tremendous growth after British Raj and Kanpur being a hub of tanneries gave a chance to a lot of local Chamar communities to engage directly in such business at large scale. A lot of Kureels were also in British Indian army and took part in Burma campaign. In 1943, the Chamar Regiment was raised which consisted many Kurils from Kanpur, Unnao, and Allahabad regions but it was disbanded in 1946.

The Kureels/Kurils have origin in Awadh region of Uttar Pradesh and primarily speak Awadhi and are spread in various states.

Kureels have been forefront runners of social reforms in Central U.P and have been associated with many movements, e.g. - Adi Hindu movement of Swami Achootanand or Ravidasia movement and later they adopted Kanbir panth by leaving menial works. Kureel Mahasabha was established in Kanpur which later got dissolved into Scheduled Castes Federation which was founded by Dr. B.R. Ambedkar.

Notable Kurils 

 Mohan Lal Kureel, British Indian Army officer from politician

 Piyare Lal Kureel 'Talib', former M.P of Banda cum Fatehpur constituency & Uttar Pradesh SCF leader
 Shiv Narain Kureel, surgeon, medical academic, professor and HOD of pediatric surgery at King George's Medical University (Lucknow)
 Pramod Kureel, former Rajya Sabha M.P from BSP
 Baijnath Kureel, former M.P & Union minister
 Manoj Kureel, political cartoonist and awardee of Life Time Achievement Award by Cartoon Watch.
 R. S. Kureel, Vice-chancellor of Dr. B.R. Ambedkar University of Social Sciences (Dongargaon. M.P)
 Jwala Prasad Kureel, former M.P of Ghatampur
 Ram Lal Kureel, former M.P and scientist of Solar Enery at CBRI.
 Keshari Lal Kureel, two-times M.P of Ghatampur
 Saroj Kureel, is an Indian Politician and a current MLA from the Ghatampur constituency under Kanpur Nagar district of Uttar Pradesh .

References 

Ethnic groups in India